Garciella is a Gram-positive, halotolerant, obligately anaerobic and moderately thermophilic bacterial genus from the family of Eubacteriaceae with one known species (Garciella nitratireducens).

References

Clostridiaceae
Bacteria genera
Monotypic bacteria genera